Rutherford is a town in Gibson County, Tennessee, United States. At the 2000 census, its population was at 1,272 and in 2010 the population was 1,151.

Geography

The current mayor is Sandy Simpson (2020)

Demographics

As of the census of 2010, there were 1,151 people, 500 households, and 329 families residing in the town. The population density was 500.4 people per square mile (195.1/km2). There were 569 housing units at an average density of 247.4 per square mile (96.4/km2). The racial makeup of the town was 82.5% White, 16.1% African American, 0.1% Native American, and 0.8% from two or more races. Hispanic or Latino of any race were 1% of the population.

There were 500 households, out of which 26.8% had children under the age of 18 living with them, 43.8% were married couples living together, 16.6% had a female householder with no husband present, and 34.2% were non-families. 32.4% of all households were made up of individuals, and 15.6% had someone living alone who was 65 years of age or older. The average household size was 2.3 and the average family size was 2.91.

In the town, the population was spread out, with 25% under the age of 20, 4.4% from 20 to 24, 22.8% from 25 to 44, 26.7% from 45 to 64, and 21% who were 65 years of age or older. The median age was 43.5 years. For every 100 females, there were 82.7 males. For every 100 females age 18 and over, there were 78.7 males.

The median income for a household in the town was $28,500, and the median income for a family was $41,250. Males had a median income of $30,625 versus $21,103 for females. The per capita income for the town was $15,311. About 15.9% of the population were below the poverty line.

Attractions and history
Rutherford promotes itself as the "Last Home of Davy Crockett". Crockett's reconstructed cabin is located in downtown Rutherford as is the grave of his mother. Rutherford hosts a community festival called "Davy Crockett Days" each year. Past grand marshals of the Davy Crockett Days Parade include Fess Parker who portrayed Davy Crockett in the 1954 Walt Disney television series Ballad of Davy Crockett.

Media

Radio Stations
 WWGY 99.3 "Today's Best Music with Ace & TJ in the Morning"
 WENK-AM 1240 "The Greatest Hits of All Time"
 WTPR-AM 710 "The Greatest Hits of All Time"
 VICTORY937 WTKB-FM 93.7 "The Victory 93.7 Contemporary Christian"

References

External links

 Town of Rutherford (Official Website)

Towns in Gibson County, Tennessee
Towns in Tennessee